The 129th Regiment of Foot was an infantry regiment of the British Army.  It was created in 1794 and disbanded in 1796. The regiment was raised at Coventry, and was originally titled the Gentlemen of Coventry's Regiment of Foot, being retitled the 129th a few days later.

References

External links

Infantry regiments of the British Army
Military units and formations established in 1794
Military units and formations disestablished in 1796
1794 establishments in Great Britain
1796 disestablishments in Great Britain